Sodium channel protein type 8 subunit alpha also known as Nav1.6  is a membrane protein encoded by the SCN8A gene. Nav1.6 is one sodium channel isoform and is the primary voltage-gated sodium channel at each node of Ranvier. The channels are highly concentrated in sensory and motor axons in the peripheral nervous system and cluster at the nodes in the central nervous system.

Structure 

Nav1.6 is encoded by the SCN8A gene which contains 27 exons and measures 170 kb. The voltage gated sodium channel is composed of 1980 residues. Like other sodium channels, Nav1.6 is a monomer composed of four homologous domains (I-IV) and 25 transmembrane segments. SCN8A encodes S3-S4 transmembrane segments which form an intracellular loop.

Function 

Like other sodium ion channels, Nav1.6 facilitates action potential propagation when the membrane potential is depolarized by an influx of Na+ ions. However, Nav1.6 is able to sustain repetitive excitation and firing. The high frequency firing characteristic of Nav1.6 is caused by a persistent and resurgent sodium current. This characteristic is caused by slow activation of the sodium channel following repolarization, which allows a steady-state sodium current after the initial action potential propagation. The steady-state sodium current contributes to the depolarization of the following action potential. Additionally, the activation threshold of Nav1.6 is lower compared to other common sodium channels such as Nav1.2. This feature allows Nav1.6 channels to rapidly recover from inactivation and sustain a high rate of activity.

Nav1.6 is expressed primarily in the nodes of Ranvier in myelinated axons but is also highly concentrated at the distal end of the axon hillock, cerebellar granule cells and Purkinje neurons and to a lower extent in non-myelinated axons and dendrites. Given the location of Nav1.6, the channel contributes to the firing threshold of a given neuron, as the electrical impulses from various inputs are summed at the axon hillock in order to reach firing threshold before propagating down the axon. Other sodium channel isoforms are expressed at the distal end of the axon hillock, including Nav1.1 and Nav1.2.

NaV1.6 channels demonstrate resistance against protein phosphorylation regulation. Sodium channels are modulated by protein kinase A and protein kinase C (PKC) phosphorylation, which reduce peak sodium currents. Dopamine and acetylcholine decrease sodium currents in hippocampal pyramidal neurons through phosphorylation. Similarly, serotonin receptors in the prefrontal cortex are regulated by PKC in order to reduce sodium currents. Phosphorylated regulation in sodium channels helps to slow inactivation. However, NaV1.6 channels lacks adequate protein kinase sites. Phosphorylation sites at amino acid residues Ser573 and Ser687 are found in other sodium channels but are not well conserved in NaV1.6. The lack of serine residues lead to the channel's ability to consistently and quickly fire following inactivation.

NaV1.6 is conversely regulated by Calmodulin (CaM). CaM interacts with the isoleucine-glutamine (IQ) motif of NaV1.6 in order to inactivate the channel. The IQ motif folds into a helix when interacting with CaM and CaM will inactivate NaV1.6 depending on the concentration of calcium. The NaV1.6 IQ demonstrates moderate affinity for CaM compared to other sodium channel isoforms such as NaV1.6. The difference in CaM affinity contributes to NaV1.6's resistance to inactivation.

Clinical significance 

The first known mutation in humans was discovered by Krishna Veeramah and Michael Hammer in 2012. The genome of a child demonstrating epileptic encephalopathy was sequenced and revealed a de novo missense mutation, p.Asn1768Asp. The missense mutations in Nav1.6 increased channel function by increasing the duration of the persistent sodium current and prevented complete inactivation following hyperpolarization. 20% of the initial current persisted 100 ms after hyperpolarization resulting in hyperexcitability of the neuron and increasing the likelihood of premature or unintentional firing. In addition to epileptic encephalopathy, the patient presented with developmental delay, autistic features, intellectual disability and ataxia.

Sodium channel conversion has been implicated in the demyelination of axons related multiple sclerosis (MS). In early stages of myelination, immature Nav1.2 channels outnumber Nav1.6 in axons. However, mature Nav1.6 channels gradually replace the other channels as myelination continues, allowing increased conduction velocity given the lower threshold of Nav1.6. However, in MS models, sodium channel conversion from mature Nav1.6 to Nav1.2 is observed.

See also 
 Sodium channel
 paralytic - SCN8A ortholog in Drosophila

References

Further reading

External links 
 

Sodium channels